A HAWK beacon (High-Intensity Activated crossWalK beacon) is a traffic control device used to stop road traffic and allow pedestrians to cross safely. It is officially known as a pedestrian hybrid beacon. The purpose of a HAWK beacon is to allow protected pedestrian crossings, stopping vehicular traffic only as needed. The HAWK beacon is a type of traffic control alternative to traffic control signals and/or where an intersection does not meet traffic signal warrants.

A HAWK beacon is used only for marked crosswalks. A similar hybrid beacon, called "emergency-vehicle hybrid beacons" are allowed at driveways of emergency service buildings such as fire stations.

History
The first beacon was developed in Tucson, Arizona by Transportation Administrator R. B. Nassi, and installed in 2000. After being inspired by a trip to Bristol where he saw a pelican crossing, he developed a prototype and his wife suggested the abbreviation HAWK. Prior to its full implementation, the HAWK beacon was categorized as an experimental device. At the time, United States transportation agencies that wanted to use the HAWK signal were required to obtain interim approval from the Federal Highway Administration (FHWA). The interim approval also required the agencies to collect and submit data on the effectiveness of the device. The device was fully implemented when it was included in the 2009 edition of the Manual on Uniform Traffic Control Devices (MUTCD) as a pedestrian hybrid beacon.

Design

The vehicular signal head has three sections, consisting of two horizontally arranged circular red sections over a single circular yellow section that is centered between the red lights. The MUTCD requires at least two HAWK signal faces facing each vehicular approach to the crossing. Normal pedestrian signal heads control pedestrian traffic.

The MUTCD has guidelines that should be met before a HAWK beacon is installed. The guidelines consider pedestrian and vehicle traffic volumes, vehicle speeds, and roadway width.

Operation

Unlike ordinary traffic signals, the vehicular signal heads of a HAWK beacon are unlit until activated by a pedestrian who wishes to cross the roadway. The pedestrian signal heads operate normally, displaying an upraised hand (don't walk) aspect during the time that vehicles have the right of way. When a pedestrian activates the beacon by pushing the pedestrian call button, the HAWK beacon sequence is started. First with flashing yellow, then steady yellow, and finally steady red over a period of several seconds. Pedestrian signal heads at either end of the crosswalk display the upraised hand (don't walk) signal until the HAWK beacon displays the steady red signal, at which time, the pedestrian heads change to the walking-person (walk) aspect.

As the pedestrian phase starts to end, the walking-person (walk) aspect changes to a flashing upraised hand (don't walk) with a countdown indicator. Pedestrians in the roadway should finish crossing the roadway, and anyone who wishes to cross but has not entered the roadway should reactivate the signal and wait. At this point, the vehicular signal heads change to display an alternating flashing red aspect. Vehicles must yield to any pedestrians still in the crosswalk. If the crosswalk is clear they may proceed after coming to a full stop.

Once the pedestrian crossing phase comes to an end, the countdown indicator reaches "0", and the pedestrian signal changes back to the non-flashing upraised hand (don't walk). Then the vehicle signal head returns to the dark state, and vehicle traffic has the right of way, until the signal is reactivated.

Sequence of signal

Effectiveness
One study released by the Federal Highway Administration found that, after a HAWK beacon was installed, vehicle/pedestrian crashes were reduced by 69%. As many as 97% of motorists comply with the HAWK beacon, higher than signalized crossing, or crossings with flashing yellow beacons.

Some motorist confusion has been reported at newly installed HAWK beacons. When first introduced to an area, enforcement and public education are needed until users understand how the beacon works. When the beacon has not been activated, some drivers have acted as if the signal is dark due to a power outage, but that has not been experienced by all jurisdictions with HAWKs in operation. The flashing red phase is sometimes misunderstood by drivers farther back in the queue, and they followed the lead driver through the crosswalk instead of stopping at the stop line as required. Additionally, motorists sometimes remain stopped during the flashing red phase when the crosswalk is clear due to the similarity to a railroad crossing signal. In 2016, to help address this issue, the Federal Highway Administration authorized use of a new traffic sign, 'R10-23a', as an alternative sign to use at HAWK beacons. The alternative signage describes the steady red and flashing red aspects more clearly to drivers.

HAWK signals were widely adopted in Phoenix, Arizona starting in 2018, resulting in significantly fewer crashes and fatalities citywide.

Unique meanings of HAWK signal aspects 
The design and operation of the HAWK beacon/crossing differs materially from the meanings and operation of the same signal aspects when used in other contexts:
 Some motor vehicle codes require that motorists stop at dark signals, which are typically indicative of an abnormality in the normal operation of the signal, such as a power failure. However, the dark signal is a normal display at HAWK beacons, where it designates the right-of-way for vehicular traffic.
 Drivers may fail to appreciate the conversion of a flashing yellow to a steady yellow signal, and thence fail to comprehend that the signal is about to change from steady yellow to red. Flashing yellow signals in other contexts are simply caution markers, and do not convert to steady yellow and thence to red in this way.
 At conventional traffic signals, the entire pedestrian crossing phase, including the entire flashing upright hand (don't walk) 'pedestrian change interval' is protected from vehicle traffic of the roadway pedestrians are crossing. However, at HAWK crossings, during the flashing upright hand (don't walk) 'pedestrian change interval', vehicles may legally proceed through the crosswalk after stopping. This could create a collision risk from a pedestrian not expecting a vehicle to enter the crosswalk.
 Some have questioned whether the arrangement and colors might confuse colorblind drivers given that the red and yellow lights can appear to be the same color and so depend upon placement to distinguish. If colorblind drivers misperceive the top two lights as yellow, this is contrary to the intention of the inventor R. B. Nassi, who said "We need to get red lights showing on these locations. Red means stop."

Alternating flashing red aspect
The alternating flashing red aspect used with the HAWK beacon has a different meaning than with other traffic control devices. 
 The alternating flashing red (wig-wag) aspect is used in several other applications for vehicle control in the United States.
 At railroad crossing signals, which several jurisdictions require drivers to treat as stop and stay.
 On school buses, all states have laws that require drivers to stop and stay upon encountering it.
 At moveable bridges, which is required to be treated as stop and stay.
The MUTCD explicitly states that use of horizontal, alternating red flashing lights should be avoided at stop signs to avoid confusion with railroad crossing signals. However, at a HAWK beacon, an alternating flashing red aspect instructs drivers to stop and proceed when clear, and is not supposed to be treated as stop and stay by drivers.
 Emergency-vehicle hybrid beacons, for emergency vehicle facilities (i.e. fire stations), use the same signal head design, and uses an alternating flashing red aspect to protect departing emergency vehicles. The only distinguishing part of the design is a different sign, R10-14, is used with the signal. Unlike at a HAWK beacon, drivers are expected to remain stopped during this time, to allow emergency vehicles to enter the roadway.

References

External links 

 Safety Effectiveness of the HAWK Pedestrian Crossing Treatment, Federal Highway Administration, July 2010
 Pedestrian Hybrid Beacon Guide – Recommendations and Case Study
 Brochure from Alexandria, Virginia, USA describing the operation of HAWK beacons
 Video of a HAWK beacon in operation in Tucson, Arizona, USA
 DC Experience with the HAWK-Hybrid Pedestrian Signal and Rectangular Rapid Flashing Beacons

Pedestrian crossings
Pedestrian crossing components
Traffic signals
Traffic law
Traffic signs